1960 in sports describes the year's events in world sport.

Alpine skiing
 The men's Olympic Gold Medal:
 Downhill: Jean Vuarnet, France
 Slalom: Ernst Hinterseer, Austria
 Giant Slalom: Roger Staub, Switzerland
 The women's Olympic Gold Medal:
 Downhill: Heidi Biebl, West Germany
 Slalom: Ann Heggtveit, Canada
 Giant Slalom: Yvonne Rüegg, Switzerland
 FIS Alpine World Ski Championships:
 Men's combined champion: Guy Périllat, France
 Women's combined champion: Ann Heggtveit, Canada, who becomes the first non-European to win a world championship title in Alpine skiing.

American football
 NFL Championship: the Philadelphia Eagles won 17–13 over the Green Bay Packers at Franklin Field in Philadelphia
 Cotton Bowl (1959 season):
 The Syracuse Orangemen won 23–17 over the Texas Longhorns to win the college football national championship
 National Football League names Pete Rozelle commissioner of the league. The league expands to Dallas for the 1960 season and Minneapolis-St.Paul for the 1961 season. The Chicago Cardinals relocate to St. Louis.
 The American Football League (AFL) played its first season
 First black pro football placekicker: Gene Mingo (Denver Broncos, AFL)
 First Hispanic pro football quarterback: Tom Flores (Oakland Raiders, AFL)
 AFL Championship: Houston Oilers won 24–16 over the Los Angeles Chargers

Association football
 England – FA Cup – Wolverhampton Wanderers won 3–0 over Blackburn Rovers
 The Soviet Union beat Yugoslavia 2–1 to win the first European Football Championship

Australian rules football
 Victorian Football League
 Melbourne wins the 64th VFL Premiership to McDonalds (Melbourne 8.14 (62) d Collingwood 2.2 (14))
 Brownlow Medal awarded to John Schultz (Footscray)

Baseball
 World Series – Pittsburgh Pirates win 4 games to 3 over the New York Yankees. The Series MVP is New York's Bobby Richardson.
 October 13 –  1960 World Series Game 7 at Forbes Field – Pittsburgh Pirates player Bill Mazeroski becomes the first person to end a World Series with a home run, and still the only player to do it in the decisive seventh game.
 The Winnipeg Goldeyes win the Northern League championship.

Basketball
NBA Finals 
Boston Celtics win four games to three over the St. Louis Hawks

Boxing
 March 16 – Flash Elorde won the world junior lightweight title with a seventh-round knockout of Harold Gomes in Quezon City, Philippines.
 June – Floyd Patterson recovered the world heavyweight title from Ingemar Johansson, becoming the first-ever boxer to do so.
 September 5 – Cassius Clay wins the gold medal in boxing at the Rome Olympic Games.

Canadian football
 Grey Cup – Ottawa Rough Riders defeated the Edmonton Eskimos 34–9

Cycling
 Tour de France – Gastone Nencini of Italy
 Giro d'Italia – Jacques Anquetil of France

Field hockey
 Olympic Games (Men's Competition) in Rome, Italy
 Gold Medal: Pakistan
 Silver Medal: India
 Bronze Medal: Spain

Figure Skating
 January 30 - US Figure Skating championship Civic Ice Arena in Seattle January 30
 US female championship won by Carol Heiss
 US male championship won by David Jenkins
 The Pairs won Nancy Ludington / Ron Ludington
 Ice dancing won Margie Ackles / Charles Phillips

Golf
Men's professional
 Masters Tournament – Arnold Palmer
 U.S. Open – Arnold Palmer
 British Open – Kel Nagle
 PGA Championship – Jay Hebert
 PGA Tour money leader – Arnold Palmer – $75,263
Men's amateur
 British Amateur – Joe Carr
 U.S. Amateur – Deane Beman
Women's professional
 Women's Western Open – Joyce Ziske
 LPGA Championship – Mickey Wright
 U.S. Women's Open – Betsy Rawls
 Titleholders Championship – Fay Crocker
 LPGA Tour money leader – Louise Suggs – $16,892

Harness racing
 United States Pacing Triple Crown races –
 Cane Pace – Countess Adios
 Little Brown Jug – Bullet Hanover
 Yonkers Trot – Duke of Decatur
 Kentucky Futurity – Elaine Rodney
 Australian Inter Dominion Harness Racing Championship –
 Pacers: Caduceus

Horse racing
Steeplechases
 Cheltenham Gold Cup – Pas Seul
 Grand National – Merryman II

Flat races
 Australia – Melbourne Cup won by
 Canada – Queen's Plate won by Victoria Park
 France – Prix de l'Arc de Triomphe won by Puissant Chef
 Ireland – Irish Derby Stakes won by Chamour
 English Triple Crown Races:
 2,000 Guineas Stakes – Martial
 The Derby – St. Paddy
 St. Leger Stakes – St. Paddy
 United States Triple Crown Races:
 Kentucky Derby – Venetian Way
 Preakness Stakes – Bally Ache
 Belmont Stakes – Celtic Ash

Ice hockey
 The American Olympic men's ice-hockey team won the United States' first Olympic hockey gold medal with a record of 7–0–0 during the tournament.
 Art Ross Trophy as the NHL's leading scorer during the regular season: Bobby Hull, Chicago Black Hawks
 Hart Memorial Trophy for the NHL's Most Valuable Player: Gordie Howe, Detroit Red Wings
 Stanley Cup – Montreal Canadiens win 4 games to 0 over the Toronto Maple Leafs
 World Hockey Championship
 Men's champion: Canada defeats the United States
 NCAA Men's Ice Hockey Championship – University of Denver Pioneers defeat Michigan Technological University Huskies 5–3 in Boston

Motorsport

Olympic Games
 1960 Summer Olympics held in Rome, Italy
 USSR wins the most medals (103), and the most gold medals (43)
 1960 Winter Olympics held in Squaw Valley, United States
 USSR wins the most medals (21), and the most gold medals (7)
 First Paralympic Games held in Rome, Italy
 Italy wins the most medals (80) and the most gold medals (29)
 First Winter Universiade held in Chamonix, France

Rugby league
1960 New Zealand rugby league season
1959–60 Northern Rugby Football League season / 1960–61 Northern Rugby Football League season
1960 NSWRFL season
1960 Rugby League World Cup

Rugby union
 66th Five Nations Championship series is shared by England and France

Swimming
 June 12 – Marianne Heemskerk from the Netherlands breaks the world record in the women's 200m butterfly during a meet in Leipzig, East Germany – 2:34.4.
 July 10 – US swimmer Michael Troy breaks his own world record in the men's 200m butterfly (long course) at a meet in Evansville, Indiana, clocking 2:15.0.
 July 23 – Thirteen days after breaking his own world record in the men's 200m butterfly (long course) Troy once again betters the world's best time in that event, this time at a meet in Toledo, Ohio  clocking 2:13.4.
 August 4 – Less than a month before the Summer Olympics in Rome, Italy, Troy again breaks the world record in the men's 200m butterfly (long course), when he clocks 2:13.2 at a meet in Detroit, Michigan.
 September 2 – Michael Troy wins the men's 200m butterfly (long course) at the Summer Olympics in Rome, Italy by breaking his own world record – 2:12.8.

Tennis
Australia
 Australian Men's Singles Championship – Rod Laver (Australia) defeats Neale Fraser (Australia) 5–7, 3–6, 6–3, 8–6, 8–6
 Australian Women's Singles Championship – Margaret Smith Court (Australia) defeats Jan Lehane O'Neill (Australia) 7–5, 6–2
England
 Wimbledon Men's Singles Championship – Neale Fraser (Australia) defeats Rod Laver (Australia) 6–4, 3–6, 9–7, 7–5
 Wimbledon Women's Singles Championship – Maria Bueno (Brazil) defeats Sandra Reynolds Price (South Africa) 8–6, 6–0
France
 French Men's Singles Championship – Nicola Pietrangeli (Italy) defeats Luis Ayala (Chile) 3–6, 6–3, 6–4, 4–6, 6–3 
 French Women's Singles Championship – Darlene Hard (USA) defeats Yola Ramírez (Mexico) 6–3, 6–4
USA
 American Men's Singles Championship – Neale Fraser (Australia) defeats Rod Laver (Australia) 	6–4, 6–4, 9–7
 American Women's Singles Championship – Darlene Hard (USA) defeats Maria Bueno (Brazil) 6–4, 10–12, 6–4
Davis Cup
 1960 Davis Cup –  4–1  at White City Stadium (grass) Sydney, Australia

Volleyball
 1960 FIVB Men's World Championship in Rio de Janeiro won by the USSR

Awards
 Associated Press Male Athlete of the Year – Rafer Johnson, Track and field
 Associated Press Female Athlete of the Year – Wilma Rudolph, Track and field

References

 
Sports by year